Redditch United Football Club is an English football club based in Redditch, Worcestershire.
Trico Stadium. They are managed by former Captain and Assistant Manager Matt Clarke.

History
They were originally called Redditch and joined the Birmingham and District League in 1921. After the war, they played in the Birmingham Combination, and were champions in 1953, before returning to the Birmingham and District.

In 1971, they changed their name to Redditch United and the following season joined the Southern League. In 1975–76, they won Division One North and were promoted to the Premier Division. In 1978–79, they finished eighth in the league, and became founder members of the Alliance Premier League. However, they finished bottom in their first season, and dropped into the Southern League's Midland Division.

After finishing as runners-up in 1985–86, the club were promoted to the Premier Division, where they remained until relegation in 1989. The following season, they reached the first round of the FA Cup, losing 3–1 to Merthyr Tydfil.In 2003–04 the club won the Southern League Western Division, and then joined Conference North.

On 17 March 2011, businessman Chris Swan took over the club, after a previous attempt to purchase Kidderminster Harriers fell through. A short time later, in May 2011, the club was relegated from the Conference North after finishing bottom of the division.

Redditch United returned to the Southern Premier Division for the 2011-12 season following their relegation the previous season. At the end of the 2015-16 season, the club finished second in the division under the management of Liam McDonald, but were denied promotion after losing in the play-off semi-finals to Leamington on penalty kicks.

Players

Current squad
 

The Southern Football League does not use a squad numbering system.

Management and coaching staff

Current staff

Honours
Birmingham Combination
Champions: 1913–14, 1932–33, 1952–53
Birmingham & District League
Southern Division champions: 1954–55
Southern League
Division One North champions: 1975–76
Western Division champions: 2003–04
Birmingham Senior Cup
Winners: 1925, 1932, 1939, 1977, 2005,
Worcestershire Senior Cup
Winners: 1894, 1930, 1975, 1976, 2008, 2014
Staffordshire Senior Cup
Winners: 1991
Worcester Royal Infirmary Cup
Winners: 1999

See also
Redditch United F.C. players
Redditch United F.C. managers

References

External links

Official website
Team profile at Global Sports Archive

 
Association football clubs established in 1891
Football clubs in Worcestershire
National League (English football) clubs
Southern Football League clubs
Redditch
1891 establishments in England
Football clubs in England